John Brzenk (born July 15, 1964) is a professional armwrestler from the United States. One of the most decorated wrestlers in the sport, Brzenk and was named in the 2000 edition of the Guinness Book of World Records, as the "Most Successful Arm Wrestler" at that time and lauded at the World Wristwrestling Championship in 1998 as "the greatest arm wrestler in the history of the sport".

Biography 
John Brzenk's father, John Brzenk Sr., was an arm wrestler, and Brzenk says he gained some of his forearm size through genetics. John started his amateur career in the classroom, where he arm wrestled students across tables for five years. When he was in eighth grade, he broke his arm while armwrestling his father's friend, and has stated that this breakage increased his tendon strength significantly. Over the years, Brzenk has often been called "The Giant Crusher", "Superman", or the "Perfect Storm" for his ability to pin opponents twice his size.

Brzenk started his professional career in 1982, at the age of 18, where he won his first world title on ABC's 1983 Wide World of Sports. John has only lost a single supermatch, and only a handful of people have ever beaten him in tournaments. Most of these losses occurred later in his career when he was of advanced age. Two of his most prominent losses were to Devon Larratt and Alexey Voyevoda, both of whom are considered legendary arm wrestlers.  Aside from arm wrestling, John works as a mechanic at Delta Air Lines. He says the job is non-physical so his arms get plenty of rest. During his career he has competed for upwards of USD$80 000.

Brzenk has won championships in a number of different weight classes, including four world championships in the heavyweight division, and the middleweight world championship. He also had an uncredited cameo in the 1987 Sylvester Stallone film Over the Top, and was the subject of the feature documentary "Pulling John", directed by  Vassiliki Khonsari and Sevan Matossian. The documentary chronicles Brzenk's legendary armwrestling career by following him intimately for 4 years, in which John competes in global tournaments and ponders retiring from the sport he loves.

On February 10, 2022, after a six year retirement, John Brzenk beat Khadzimurat Zoloev at the age of 57, to once again reclaim the world’s top ranking in the 225 pound division. 

On August 6, 2022, at the fourth installment of international arm wrestling tournament East vs West, John Brzenk was defeated in a right-handed supermatch with Kazakhstan armwrestler Kydyrgali Ongarbaev. November 19th of the same year, in the next installment of East vs West, Brzenk would defeat Oleg Petrenko in a right-handed supermatch in dominant fashion, 3-0.

Physical statistics 
 Height: 6'1"
 Weight: Varies between 195 and 225 lbs, depending on competition classes.
 Style: Varies
 Biceps: 18.25in
 Forearm:
 Right: 16.5in
 Left: 13.5in

Achievements 

A1 Russian Open
2015 – R-2nd Place
2014 – R-3rd Place

AAA Stand-Up National
 1984 – R200 lbs
 1985 – R185 lbs
 1986 – R220 lbs
 1990 – R220 lbs

Arnold Classic
 2006 – R199+
 2007 – R199+

AWI World
 1986 – Pro Super Heavyweight
 1987 – Pro Light Heavyweight
 1988 – Pro Light Heavyweight
 1995 – Pro Light Heavyweight
 2001 – Pro Super Heavyweight

Carling O’Keefe International
 1989 – R 200 lbs, R 231+ lbs

Forsa Tropical International
 1998 – R198 lbs, R243+ lbs, L198 lbs

GNC Pro Performance
 2002 – R198 lbs

GOLDEN BEAR
 SUPERMATCH (Absolut Champion)
 R1994
 Pro tournament
 R90+ kg: 1990, 1994, 1998
 R90 kg: 1990

Harley Pull
 2000 – R220 lbs + Harley Winner
 2001 – R220 lbs
 2002 – R198 lbs, L198 lbs
 2009 – R225 lbs, L225 lbs + Harley Winner

Main Event
 1998 – R220 lbs

Mike Gould Classic
 2006 – R220 lbs, L220 lbs
 2010 – R220 lbs

Mohegan Sun PAC World
 2005 – R198 lbs, L198 lbs
 2006 – R242 lbs, R243+ lbs
 2007 – R198 lbs, L198 lbs

Over the Top
 1986 – Winner of Truckers Division in Heavyweight class

Reno Reunion
 1999 – R200 lbs, R230 lbs, R231+ lbs, L200 lbs
 2000 – R198 lbs, R242 lbs, R243+ lbs, L198 lbs, L242 lbs
 2001 – R198 lbs, R242 lbs, R243+ lbs, L198 lbs
 2002 – R198 lbs, R242 lbs, R243+ lbs, L198 lbs, L242 lbs
 2003 – R233+ lbs
 2006 – R242 lbs, R243+ lbs
 2006 – R242 lbs, R243+ lbs

ROTN
 2007 – R215 lbs, L215 lbs
 2008 – R242 lbs, L242 lbs
 2009 – R199+ lbs

Sands International Wrist Wrestling/Armwrestling
 1988 – R190 lbs
 1989 – R190 lbs, R215 lbs

Sherkston Beaches International
 1987 – R200 lbs, R201+ lbs

SuperStar Showdown
 2004 – R199+ lbs
 2005 – R198 lbs

Ultimate Armwrestling (Las Vegas)
 2004 – R242 lbs
 2005 – R198 lbs, L198 lbs
 2006 – R242 lbs, R243+ lbs

Ultimate Armwrestling League
 2011 – R200 lbs (Current Champion)

USAA National Pro-Am
 1996 – R200 lbs, R201+ lbs
 1997 – R198 lbs, R242 lbs, R243+ lbs, L198 lbs
 1998 – R242 lbs, R243+ lbs
 1999 – R198 lbs, R242 lbs, R243+ lbs, L198 lbs, L242 lbs
 2000 – R242 lbs, R243+ lbs, L242 lbs, L243+ lbs
 2001 – R242 lbs, R243+ lbs, L242 lbs, L243+ lbs
 2002 – R198 lbs, R242 lbs, R243+ lbs, L198 lbs, L242 lbs
 2003 – R242 lbs, R243+ lbs
 2004 – R242 lbs, R243+ lbs, L242 lbs
 2005 – R242 lbs
 2006 – R242 lbs, R243+ lbs
 2007 – R242 lbs, R243+ lbs
 2009 – R242 lbs, R243+ lbs, L242 lbs, L243+ lbs
 2010 – R242 lbs, R243+ lbs

USAF Unified National
 2005 – R220 lbs

WAF World Armwrestling Championship
 1999 – L100 kg, Supermatch Winner

WAL
 2015 – R: Heavyweight Champion

World Wristwrestling Championship (Petaluma)
 Heavyweight Division
 R: 1988, 1989, 1990, 1991, 1996, 1998, 2001
 Light Heavyweight Division
 R: 1998, 2001
 L: 1998, 2001
 Middleweight Division
 R – 1988, 1989, 1990, 1991, 1996, 1998, 2001
 L – 1996, 1998, 2001
 Lightweight Division
 R – 1984

WPAA World
 1985 – Middleweight

Yukon Jack National/World
 Heavyweight Division
 R: 1990, 1991, 1992, 1993,
 Middleweight Division
 R: 1995, 1996.

Zloty Tur/Nemiroff World Cup
 Category – Open
 R: 2006, 2007, 2008, 2009
 Category – 95 kg
 R: 2004, 2006, 2007, 2008, 2009
 L: 2007, 2009

References

External links 
Armwrestlers ONLY
Ifitandhealthy.com
Videos with John Brzenk

1964 births
Male arm wrestlers
American arm wrestlers
Living people
People from McHenry, Illinois